Aye Aye Aung (born 2 December 1984 in Yangon, Myanmar) is a Burmese judoka. She competed at the 2012 Summer Olympics in the -78 kg event.

References

External links
 

1984 births
Living people
Burmese female judoka
Olympic judoka of Myanmar
Judoka at the 2012 Summer Olympics
Sportspeople from Yangon
Southeast Asian Games medalists in judo
Southeast Asian Games gold medalists for Myanmar
Southeast Asian Games bronze medalists for Myanmar
Southeast Asian Games silver medalists for Myanmar
Competitors at the 2007 Southeast Asian Games